Justice is a British legal drama, starring Robert Pugh and Gillian Kearney, that was broadcast from 4 to 8 April 2011, on BBC One. Pugh stars as Judge Patrick Coburn, the officiate of a community justice centre in his childhood home of Dovefield in Liverpool. Kearney stars as Louise Scanlon, a local investigative journalist who becomes caught up in Coburn's efforts to bring local tearaway Jake Little (Jake Abraham) to justice.

As well as featuring individual stories, the series features an ongoing story arc throughout all five episodes. As well as looking at the work of the justice centre, plotlines also look at Coburn's troubled past and the relationship with parish priest Father Jim Kelly (Tom Georgeson). The series was released on Region 1 DVD on 25 October 2011. No further series of Justice were commissioned, due to then-BBC1 controller Danny Cohen claiming that there were "too many crime dramas on TV", and axing it alongside other BBC crime dramas, including Zen.

Cast
 Robert Pugh as Judge Patrick Coburn
 Gillian Kearney as Louise Scanlon
 Tom Georgeson as Father Jim Kelly
 Gary Mavers as Joe Gateacre
 Jake Abraham as Jake Little
 Jodie Comer as Sharna Mulhearne
 Ellie Paskell as Kaz Kenny
 Tricia Penrose as Hayley Gosling
 Louis Emerick as Patrick "PD" Dempsey
 Glenn Wild as Adam

Episodes

References

External links

2010s British drama television series
2010s British legal television series
2011 British television series debuts
2011 British television series endings
BBC high definition shows
BBC television dramas
2010s British crime television series
2010s British television miniseries
English-language television shows
BBC television miniseries
BBC Daytime television series